Horst Tiedge (born 1935) was a West German luger who competed in the late 1950s and early 1960s. He won the bronze medal in the men's doubles event at the 1960 FIL World Luge Championships in Garmisch-Partenkirchen, West Germany. He was born in Ilmenau.

References

External links
Hickok sports information on World champions in luge and skeleton.
SportQuick.com information on World champions in luge 

German male lugers
1935 births
Living people
20th-century German people